Coed-Ely or Coedely is a small village located to the south of Tonyrefail in south Wales and is located in the County Borough of Rhondda Cynon Taf. The name Coed-Ely is a derivative of the Welsh words Coed-Elái which can be loosely translated into English as Ely Woods.

'Coedely' is also a community ward for elections to Tonyrefail Community Council.

References

Villages in Rhondda Cynon Taf